Sarah Isabel Clelland (born 11 August 1997) is a Scottish football who plays for Spartans in the Scottish Women's Premier League (SWPL) as a full back. She has also played international handball for Scotland and Great Britain.

Club career
Clelland played for four years at Rangers before she joined Glasgow City in August 2015. In July 2016, she signed for Spartans.

International career
Clelland has represented Scotland at the under-17 and under-19 levels, including at the 2014 UEFA Women's Under-17 Championship, 2015 UEFA Women's Under-17 Championship, and 2017 UEFA Women's Under-19 Championships.

Honors
Glasgow City
 Scottish Women's Premier League: 2015
 Scottish Women's Cup: 2015

References

External links 
 Sarah Clelland at UEFA.com

1997 births
Living people
Scottish women's footballers
Scottish Women's Premier League players
Women's association football midfielders
Rangers W.F.C. players
Glasgow City F.C. players
Spartans W.F.C. players
People educated at Calderglen High School
Footballers from South Lanarkshire
Sportspeople from East Kilbride